The Birmingham Classic was a golf tournament on the LPGA Tour from 1972 to 1982. It was played at the Green Valley Country Club in Birmingham, Alabama.

Winners
Birmingham Classic
1982 Beth Daniel
1981 Beth Solomon
1980 Barbara Barrow

Otey Crisman Classic
1979 Jane Blalock

Birmingham Classic
1978 Hollis Stacy
1977 Debbie Austin
1976 Jan Stephenson
1975 Maria Astrologes
1974 Jane Blalock
1973 Gloria Ehret

Birmingham Centennial Classic
1972 Betty Burfeindt

References

Former LPGA Tour events
Golf in Alabama
Sports in Birmingham, Alabama
Women's sports in Alabama
Recurring sporting events established in 1972
Recurring sporting events disestablished in 1982
1972 establishments in Alabama
1982 disestablishments in Alabama